Peyk (also Romanized as Peik and Pīk) is a village in Rudshur Rural District, in the Central District of Zarandieh County, Markazi Province, Iran. At the 2006 census, its population was 214, in 61 families.

References 

Populated places in Zarandieh County